Bacterial evolution may refer to the biological evolution of bacteria as studied in:
Bacterial taxonomy
List of Bacteria genera
List of bacterial orders
List of Archaea genera
List of Prokaryotic names with Standing in Nomenclature
Bacterial phylodynamics
Bacterial phyla
Branching order of bacterial phyla (Woese, 1987)
Branching order of bacterial phyla (Gupta, 2001)
Branching order of bacterial phyla (Cavalier-Smith, 2002)
Branching order of bacterial phyla (Rappe and Giovanoni, 2003)
Branching order of bacterial phyla (Ciccarelli et al., 2006)
Branching order of bacterial phyla (Battistuzzi et al., 2004)
'The All-Species Living Tree' Project
Branching order of bacterial phyla (Genome Taxonomy Database, 2018)

Bacteria
Biological evolution